Tooro may refer to:
 Tooro language, a Bantu language of Uganda
 Tooro Kingdom, a traditional kingdom of Uganda

See also 
 Futa Tooro, a region in western Africa